Saint-Christophe-sur-Roc is a commune in the Deux-Sèvres department in western France.

Geography
Saint-Christophe-sur-Roc is located  North of Niort and  Southwest of Parthenay. The commune consists of the main village Saint-Christophe-sur-Roc and a few outlying localities, including Boisne and Le Breuil. Neighboring communes are Champdeniers-Saint-Denis, Cherveux and La Chapelle-Bâton.

Culture
The village is the home of the Compagnie Carabosse, famous for its fire-based installations that have visited many cities throughout Europe and beyond.

Sites of interest
An underground river flows under the village, with a length of about  
An old dairy factory dating back to 1884, registered as a monument since 2002.

See also
Communes of the Deux-Sèvres department

References

Communes of Deux-Sèvres